Terje Stenehjem Skjeldestad (born 18 January 1978) is a retired Norwegian professional football goalkeeper.

References

External links
Terje Stenehjem Skjeldestad at Sogndal Fotball (via archive.org)

1978 births
Living people
Norwegian footballers
Norway youth international footballers
Norway under-21 international footballers
Norway international footballers
Eliteserien players
Sogndal Fotball players
Association football goalkeepers
People from Sogndal
Sportspeople from Vestland